Nervia nancy is a species of butterfly in the family Hesperiidae. It is found in Kenya (Ukambani country and the Chyulu Hills).

References

Butterflies described in 1991
Endemic insects of Kenya
Butterflies of Africa